Chitur is a rural locality (a selo) in Kulushatsky Selsoviet, Laksky District, Republic of Dagestan, Russia. The population was 100 as of 2010. There are 4 streets.

Geography 
Chitur is located 4 km southwest of Kumukh (the district's administrative centre) by road, on the Chitturdanikh River. Kulushats and Kubra are the nearest rural localities.

Nationalities 
Laks live there.

References 

Rural localities in Laksky District